The Buta is a small left tributary of the river Jiul de Vest in Romania. It discharges into the Jiul de Vest upstream from Câmpu lui Neag.

References

Rivers of Romania
Rivers of Hunedoara County